Hebdomactis is a genus of moths in the family Alucitidae. It was described by Edward Meyrick in 1929, and contains the single species Hebdomactis crystallodes. It is found in New Guinea.

References

Monotypic moth genera
Alucitidae
Ditrysia genera